Rachel Walker (born 1976) is an English-born singer of Scottish Gaelic folk music, having performed and recorded as a solo artist as well as in bands, such as Skipinnish.

Born in Salisbury, she moved to Wester Ross at age eight, and attended Kinlochewe Primary School and Gairloch High School, learning Gaelic song and traditional music.

On leaving school, Walker completed a course in Classical music at Napier University and in 1996, she was accepted as one of the first students on the brand new Scottish music course at the Royal Scottish Academy of Music and Drama where she studied Gaelic song under the tutelage of the renowned Gaelic singer Kenna Campbell.

She is married to Skipinnish piper Andrew Stevenson and has two children.

Discography
 Braighe Loch Iall (2004)
 Fon Reul-Sholus (2006). 
 Air Chall (2010)
 Gaol (2020)
 A Happy Place (with Arron Jones) (2021)
 Despite The Wind And Rain (with Arron Jones) (2022)

References

External links
 

1976 births
Living people
English women singer-songwriters
Scottish folk singers
Scottish Gaelic singers
People educated at Gairloch High School
21st-century Scottish singers
21st-century English women singers
21st-century English singers